The 2015 season was the inaugural season of competitive association football played by Bali United Football Club, a professional football club based in Gianyar, Bali, Indonesia as a new club following the team's change of name from Putra Samarinda.

Following Putra Samarinda's result from the 2014 Indonesia Super League, Bali United played their first season in the Indonesia Super League.

They unable to finished the league and Piala Indonesia was cancelled  because all competition this season was discontinued by PSSI on 2 May 2015 due to a ban by the sports minister on PSSI running any football competition.

Pre-season and friendlies

Friendlies

Bali Island Cup

Sunrise of Java Cup

Indonesia President's Cup

General Sudirman Cup

Match results

Super League

Piala Indonesia

Player details

Appearances and goals

Disciplinary record

Transfers

Inaugural players 
These were inaugural players for Bali United that signed the contract before the start of 2015 Indonesia Super League.

Transfers in 
These list include the players who signed the contract after 2015 Indonesia Super League start.

Transfers out 
These list include the players who left the club after they signed a contract.

References 

Bali United F.C. seasons
Bali United